Masafi Sports Club is an Emirati football club based in Masafi. The team currently plays in the UAE First Division League.

Current squad 

As of UAE Division One:

References

Masafi
1982 establishments in the United Arab Emirates
Association football clubs established in 1982
Football clubs in the Emirate of Ras Al Khaimah